Springwest Academy, formerly Feltham Community College, is a Secondary school in Feltham in the London Borough of Hounslow.

Overview
In addition to the mainstream school, FCC incorporates two specialist units: the Autism Resource Centre (ARC), and the PD Centre for students with physical disabilities.

History
In the 1960s three schools, Tudor Grammar, De Brome (Boys Secondary Modern) School and Lafone (Girls Secondary Modern) School, were amalgamated to form Feltham Comprehensive School, known as "The Feltham School". The school ran from three sites, Upper School, Browells Lane (former Tudor Grammar site), and East and West Buildings located in Boundaries Road on the opposite side of the busy A312 Uxbridge Road. The Boundaries Road buildings were the former De Brome and Lafone sites respectively.

When Feltham School opened, the former Lafone building had 12-form entry at age 11,("Lower School") with pupils transferring to the De Brome building ("Middle School") for what were then known as the third and fourth years of secondary school (years 9 and 10 under the current year name system). In later years, prior to the move to a single site, both these buildings accommodated 11-14 year olds, i.e. present school years 7-10, with an equal number of forms in each building. 
 
During the late 1970s the school had a poor reputation. The first head teacher of Feltham School, Percy Bambury, encountered many difficulties related to the adjustment to a non-selective comprehensive system while trying to retain many of the high standards of achievement of the former Tudor Grammar, of which he had also been Head Teacher.  Separate Deputy Heads for each of the individual buildings attempted to encourage pupils to aim high and "seize the day" (the English translation of the new school's motto, still in use today). The catchment area for the school is often described by media commentators as a tough working class suburb of London, though in reality children at the school come from a wide range of backgrounds in an area with Heathrow Airport as the principal employer, but many other service, IT and retail industries operating in the area too.

The poor reputation may not have been entirely justified, however. The school achieved considerable success with musical productions and individual achievers such as Michael Collins and Wilfred Penny-Worth-Smythe. Also during this period, starting in November 1975, Deputy Head Brian Tyler (later featured in a BBC TV series about another comprehensive of which he became head) instituted what became a regular exchange programme for a number of years between students in the upper years of the school and Eton College in nearby Windsor. Feltham students stayed in the Eton College houses, went to lessons and generally entered into Eton's extra-curricular activities, while their Eton counterparts of similar age attended classes and social activities at Feltham while staying with the families of their exchanges.

The appointment of Paul M. Grant as Head Teacher on the retirement of Percy Bambury in 1976 led to improvements in both discipline and standards. There was also a large investment in the school by the London Borough of Hounslow. A sixth form centre and additional facilities for pupils of 15–16 years, necessitated by the raising of the school leaving age in 1973, had led to the construction of what became known as the ROSLA block on the Browells Lane site.  This was followed with the opening in 1983 of the Art, Design and Technology Building, and the construction of the first astroturf pitches in the borough.

With the completion of this building, the former Lafone Girls School site (by now known as Lower West) was closed, with the exception of the separate gymnasium building. The main school building had been diagnosed with concrete cancer and was scheduled for demolition, which was completed by 1985.

Through the mid to late 1980s, the school became more involved in community education, no longer restricting use of the school for those between the ages 11 to 19. This led to the school changing its name to Feltham Community School. Popular evening classes even enabled former less successful students of the school to re-take A Levels in adult life and in many cases to go on to mature age entry to higher education.

The school continued working on two sites, i.e. the old De Brome ("Lower East") building and the Browells Lane  (Tudor) complex, with pupils having to move between both via a purpose-built footbridge across the main road during breaks until the new Maths, Science, IT, and Library building was opened in 1985. Once open the former De Brome Boys School or East Building was closed, again with the exception of the gym. The De Brome building as a whole has however since remained in largely educational and Youth Service use, initially as a Road Safety Centre for the borough of Hounslow, and now as the Feltham campus of West Thames College, which offers mainly tertiary and technical education for the 16-19 year age group, though some provision is also now being made for younger pupils post-14 to study technical subjects here. Noteworthy.

In April 1986 the new state of the art Library was officially opened as the Russell Kerr Library, by the Labour Party leader at the time, the Right Honourable Neil Kinnock. Australian-born Kerr had been the area's Labour MP for many years.  A time capsule was also buried with contemporary items to be unearthed 50 years later.

The final stage of development, a new sports complex, was delayed due to council cuts. This left sports and Physical Education still on three sites. In the early 1990s the new sports complex was built and completed. This finally brought the school on to one site.

The former Lafone Girls School (West Building) site has since become a small housing estate, the names of which include De Brome Road, Slattery Road (after a former local councillor) and Wyatt Close. The former school gym still exists and is now used by Sportac 76, a Sports Gymnastics club which began life in the year of the Montreal Olympic games and the success of Jeff Davis, a former Tudor and Feltham pupil who was a talented gymnast.

The Browells lane site stands on part of Hanworth Park, also known as Hanworth Air Park which was one of London's first aerodromes. These were once the grounds of Hanworth Palace, a former hunting lodge for King Henry VIII of England, hence the original grammar school's name of "Tudor Grammar" with the Tudor rose as its emblem.

The school converted to an academy in 2011, but remained Feltham Community College, until it was renamed in 2016, as the current Springwest Academy.

While named Feltham Community College, Ms Smith remained headteacher until Ms Victoria Eadie was in the post in 2010.
Mr Simon Hart is the current Principal of Springwest Academy.
The actor, Martin Freeman, officially opened the new school library on 4 November 2021.

Notable former pupils
 Levi Bellfield - Serial killer
 Patsy Morris, victim of unsolved murder in 1980 (Bellfield's childhood girlfriend at the school)
 Tommy Boyd - TV presenter and broadcaster
 Mo Farah - (double Olympic gold medalist, 5000 metres and 10000 metres men's track events, London 2012)
 Jamie O'Callaghan - (Harlequins Rugby League)
 Benedict Taylor - TV, film and stage actor

References

External links
College website

Academies in the London Borough of Hounslow
Secondary schools in the London Borough of Hounslow